Magdalena Frąckowiak (born 8 October 1984) is a Polish model and jewelry designer who began appearing on international runways in 2006.

Early life 
Born in Gdańsk, Poland, Frąckowiak was sixteen when her mother 
Danuta sent her pictures to a Warsaw agency's modeling contest, which she won. Her first paid assignment was for Machina magazine. Frąckowiak resided in Mississauga, Ontario, Canada when she moved from Poland.

Career 
Frąckowiak featured prominently in the 2008 Ralph Lauren, Alessandro Dell'Acqua, and Oscar de la Renta print campaigns, and she has been on the cover of Italian, German, Japanese, and Russian Vogue and French Revue de Modes Vogue Paris declared her one of the top 30 models of the 2000s.

Frąckowiak walked the 2010, 2012, 2013, 2014 and 2015 Victoria's Secret Fashion Shows, and has a starring role in the Lagerfeld-directed video for the brand Hogan, alongside Baptiste Giabiconi and Sebastien Jondeau, which hit stores at the end of January 2011.

She has walked for many top runways including Shiatzy Chen, Elie Saab, Miu Miu, Chanel, Gianfranco Ferré, Hakaan, John Galliano, Viktor & Rolf, Christian Dior, Lanvin, Balmain, Roberto Cavalli, Dolce & Gabbana, Emilio Pucci, Fendi, Prada, Givenchy, Versace, Etro, D&G, Ralph Lauren, Oscar de la Renta, Alexander Wang, Louis Vuitton, Giorgio Armani, Jean Paul Gaultier, Hermès, Chloé, Karl Lagerfeld, Balenciaga, MaxMara, Blumarine, & Paco Rabanne.

Frąckowiak is also featured in the 2011 Pirelli Calendar photographed by Karl Lagerfeld.

In mid-2015, she launched her own jewelry brand Magdalena Frąckowiak Jewelry. In March 2018, she announced she was creating a YouTube channel titled, "Magdalena the Queen".

References

External links
 Style.com (American Vogue / W Magazine)
 
 Magdalena Frackowiak Jewelry

1984 births
Living people
Polish female models
Polish designers
People from Gdańsk
People from Mississauga
Polish emigrants to Canada
Jewellery designers